Palestine is a village which lies in the civil parish of Over Wallop, approximately  south-west of Andover, in Hampshire, England.

It consists mainly of fields, farms and a few dozen houses with the built-up area having 283 residents at the 2011 Census. Most houses are built in a bungalow style.

The main roads are Streetway Road, Mount Hermon Road and Mount Carmel Road.

The settlement adjoins the village of Grateley, which has a railway station with hourly South Western Railway trains to London Waterloo and Salisbury, half hourly in peak times.

The parish boundary runs down the centre of Streetway Road, meaning that when a new housing development was built on the north side of the road, the residents on the south side could not officially object, as the development was within a different parish.

References

External links

 http://www.streetmap.co.uk/place/Hampshire_Gap_in_Hampshire_535611_251611.htm
Palestine
the Portway Roman Road

Villages in Hampshire